Danis Tanović (born 20 February 1969) is a Bosnian film director and screenwriter. He is best known for having directed and written the script for the 2001 Bosnian movie No Man's Land which won him many awards, including an Academy Award for Best Foreign Language Film and a Golden Globe Award for Best Foreign Language Film among many others.

Tanović has also written and directed the award-winning Bosnian films An Episode in the Life of an Iron Picker and Death in Sarajevo. He is regarded as one of the best Bosnian directors and screenwriters of all time, and also one of the best from Southeast Europe.

Tanović is the only person born in the territory of present-day Bosnia and Herzegovina to have won an Academy Award.

Life and career 
Tanović was born in Zenica, SR Bosnia and Herzegovina, SFR Yugoslavia on 20 February 1969. He was raised in the Bosnian capital of Sarajevo, where he also received his primary and secondary education. Tanović also attended the University of Sarajevo Music Conservatory, where he played the piano. As a young adult, he decided to study at the Academy of Performing Arts in Sarajevo. However, due to the Siege of Sarajevo and the Bosnian War, Tanović was forced to stop his studies in 1992. Immediately after war broke out, Tanović formed a film crew that followed the Army of the Republic of Bosnia and Herzegovina going on dangerous missions. The material that he and the film crew produced has since been used in numerous films and news reports about the Siege of Sarajevo and the Bosnian War.

In late 1994, Tanović left the film crew he had worked with for over two years. A year later, he decided to resume his studies, this time in Brussels, the capital of Belgium. In 1997, he completed his studies in Brussels, graduating at the top of his class. During his studies, Tanović made several documentary films.

Shortly after, he began his first movie project, entitled No Man's Land. He wrote and directed the movie, which was completed in 2001 and premiered at the Cannes Film Festival that same year. No Man's Land went on to win the Award for Best Screenplay (Prix du scénario) at Cannes, followed by numerous awards including the Oscar for Best Foreign Language Film in 2001, the European Film Academy Award for Best Screenplay, the César for the Best First Feature Film, the André Cavens Award for Best Film in 2001, and the Golden Globe Award for Best Foreign Language Film in 2002.

Tanović was a member of the jury at the 2003 Cannes Film Festival.

His second feature project was L'Enfer, completed in 2005, from the screenplay by the late Krzysztof Kieślowski and Krzysztof Piesiewicz. The film marked the second installment in the Polish duo's projected trilogy Heaven (filmed by Tom Tykwer in 2002), Hell and Purgatory. Inspired by Euripides' Medea, L'Enfer explores the lives of three sisters, "each locked in her own unhappiness, nursing a secret flower of misery, the seed for which was planted by their late father with a terrible incident in their girlhood" (from a review by Peter Bradshaw). The film received mixed reviews.

Tanović announced in March 2008 that he would be founding a political party with his friend, director Dino Mustafić, called Our Party, which would start contesting elections with the local elections in October 2008. He stated his motivations as wanting to bring political change to the country; his announcement was received positively.

His 2010 film Cirkus Columbia was selected as the Bosnian entry for the Best Foreign Language Film at the 83rd Academy Awards, but it didn't make the final shortlist.

In June 2011, Tanović was bestowed with an "honoris causa" doctorate by the University of Sarajevo.
 
His 2013 film An Episode in the Life of an Iron Picker premiered in competition at the 63rd Berlin International Film Festival where it won two prizes: Silver Bear for Best Actor and the Jury Grand Prix.

His 2016 film "Death in Sarajevo" won the Jury Grand Prix at the 66th Berlin International Film Festival. It has also won the FIPRESCI Award for the best film in competition. In March 2020, Tanović's film The Postcard Killings was released, based on the 2010 crime novel "The Postcard Killers". His latest film, Not So Friendly Neighborhood Affair, was released in August 2021.

Tanović holds joint Bosnian and Belgian citizenship and lives in Sarajevo with his wife Maelys de Rudder and five children. He lived in Paris until 2007.

Filmography

Awards and nominations

References

External links

1969 births
Living people
Writers from Zenica
Politicians from Zenica
Bosniaks of Bosnia and Herzegovina
Bosnia and Herzegovina film directors
Bosnia and Herzegovina film producers
Bosnia and Herzegovina screenwriters
Male screenwriters
Directors of Best Foreign Language Film Academy Award winners
Cannes Film Festival Award for Best Screenplay winners
European Film Award for Best Screenwriter winners
Our Party (Bosnia and Herzegovina) politicians
Political party founders
Bosnia and Herzegovina male writers